Anthony Richard Manfreda (February 19, 1904 – October 9, 1988) was an American football halfback.  He holds the Holy Cross record for most yards gained (100 against Boston University in 1929) on a kickoff return. He played high school football for Sanborn Seminary in Kingston, New Hampshire. He also played in the National Football League for the Newark Tornadoes (2 games in 1930). He was born in Meriden, Connecticut.

External links
 NFL.com stats
 pro-football-reference.com stats
 Anthony Manfreda's obituary 

1904 births
1988 deaths
People from Meriden, Connecticut
People from Kingston, New Hampshire
American football halfbacks
College of the Holy Cross alumni
Newark Tornadoes players
Players of American football from Connecticut
Sportspeople from New Haven County, Connecticut
Sportspeople from Rockingham County, New Hampshire